The sphenoethmoidal recess is a small space in the nasal cavity into which the sphenoidal sinus and posterior ethmoid sinus open. It lies posterior and superior to the superior concha. The sphenoethmoidal recess drains the posterior ethmoid air cells and sphenoid sinuses into the superior meatus of the nasal cavity.

References

External links
  - "The turbinates have been cut and removed to illustrate the meatus and openings into them."

Nose